The Martinsville Micropolitan Statistical Area is a United States Micropolitan Statistical Area (USA) in Virginia, as defined by the Office of Management and Budget (OMB) as of June, 2003. As of the 2000 census, the μSA had a population of 73,346 (though a July 1, 2009 estimate placed the population at 69,523).

Components
Note: Since a state constitutional change in 1871, all cities in Virginia are independent cities that are not located in any county. The OMB considers these independent cities to be county-equivalents for the purpose of defining μSAs in Virginia.

One county and one independent city are included in the Martinsville Micropolitan Statistical Area.

Counties
Henry
Independent Cities
Martinsville

Communities
Cities
Martinsville (Principal city)
Towns
Ridgeway
Census-designated places
Bassett
Chatmoss
Collinsville
Fieldale
Horsepasture
Laurel Park
Oak Level
Sandy Level
Stanleytown
Villa Heights
Unincorporated places
Axton
Spencer

Demographics
As of the census of 2000, there were 73,346 people, 30,408 households, and 20,974 families residing within the μSA. The racial makeup of the μSA was 70.43% White, 16.04% African American, 0.15% Native American, 0.41% Asian, 0.03% Pacific Islander, 1.24% from other races, and 0.90% from two or more races. Hispanics or Latinos of any race were 13.92% of the population.

The median income for a household in the μSA was $29,629 and the median income for a family was $36,985. Males had a median income of $27,595 versus $21,067 for females. The per capita income for the μSA was $17,181.

See also
Virginia census statistical areas

References

 
Martinsville, Virginia
Henry County, Virginia